"In My Bones" is a single by American singer Ray Dalton. It was released on January 17, 2020. A remix for the song was made by Malik Montana.

Charts

Weekly charts

Year-end charts

Certifications

References 

Ray Dalton songs
2020 songs
2020 singles
Epic Records singles
Songs written by Ray Dalton
Songs written by Joacim Persson